The 1866 West Virginia gubernatorial election took place on October 25, 1866, to elect the governor of West Virginia.

Results

References

1866
gubernatorial
West Virginia
October 1866 events